James Witherspoon (born October 3, 1951) is a Canadian retired professional ice hockey defenceman who played 2 games in the National Hockey League with the Los Angeles Kings during the 1975–76 season. The rest of his career, which lasted from 1974 to 1978, was spent in the minor leagues. Prior to turning professional Witherspoon played for Ohio State University.

Career statistics

Regular season and playoffs

Awards and honours

References

External links
 

1951 births
Living people
Canadian ice hockey defencemen
Fort Worth Texans players
Los Angeles Kings players
Ohio State Buckeyes men's ice hockey players
Ice hockey people from Toronto
Springfield Indians players
Undrafted National Hockey League players